Victoria Beach is a small community in the Canadian province of Nova Scotia, in Annapolis County. It is on the shore of Digby Gut, a narrow channel connecting the Bay of Fundy with the Annapolis Basin.

In 1849, it was the western terminus of Nova Scotia pony express, and a federal plaque in the community commemorates it.

The heritage lighthouse at Battery Point is an eight metre tall wooden structure with octagonal iron lantern and was built in 1901.

The area was labelled as Andromeda on a 1609 map by Marc Lescarbot, but was renamed for Queen Victoria following her silver jubilee in 1862.

References

Further reading

Communities in Annapolis County, Nova Scotia